The 259th Battalion, Canadian Rifles, CEF (Siberia), was an infantry battalion of the Canadian Expeditionary Force Siberia during the Great War.

History 
The 259th Battalion was authorized on 1 November 1918 and embarked for Russia on 22 and 26 December 1918. The unit disembarked at Vladivostok on 12 and 15 January 1919 where it served with the 16th Infantry Brigade as part of the Allied Forces in eastern Russia until 19 May 1919. The battalion disbanded on 6 November 1920.

The 259th Battalion recruited in London and Kingston, Ontario, and Montreal and Quebec City, Quebec and was mobilized at Victoria, British Columbia.

The 259th Battalion was commanded by Lt.-Col. A.E. Swift.

Perpetuations 
Since 25 June 1998, the 259th Battalion, Canadian Rifles, CEF (Siberia), has been perpetuated by the 12e Régiment blindé du Canada.

Battle Honours 
The 259th Battalion was awarded the battle honour SIBERIA 1918-19.

See also 

 List of infantry battalions in the Canadian Expeditionary Force

References

Sources
Canadian Expeditionary Force 1914–1919 by Col. G.W.L. Nicholson, CD, Queen's Printer, Ottawa, Ontario, 1962

259
Military units and formations of Ontario
Military units and formations of Quebec